Fountain of Youth is a 2014 album by The Rippingtons.

Track listing
All music written by Russ Freeman.

"Spice Route" - 4:06
"Rivers of Gold" - 4:15
"North Shore" - 5:24
"We Will Live Forever" - 4:43
"The Sun King" - 4:14
"Fountain of Youth" - 4:05
"Emerald City" - 5:17
"Soul Riders" - 4:54
"Waterfalls of Bequia" - 2:58
"Garden of the Gods" - 5:04

Personnel 
 Russ Freeman – guitars, electric sitar, keyboards, bass and rhythm programming 
 Bill Heller – keyboards 
 Rico Belled – bass
 Dave Karasony – drums
 Jeff Kashiwa – saxophones

Production 
 Russ Freeman – producer, executive producer, arrangements, recording, mixing, sleeve notes, design, artwork 
 Andi Howard – executive producer, management 
 Bernie Grundman – mastering 
 Bill Mayer – cover artwork 
Studios
 Recorded and Mixed at Surfboard Studios (Marina del Rey, California).
 Mastered at Bernie Grundman Mastering (Hollywood, California).

The Rippingtons albums
2014 albums